David Weyhe Smith (September 24, 1926 – January 23, 1981) was an American pediatrician and dysmorphologist, best known for his book book Recognizable Patterns of Human Malformation and for describing Fetal alcohol syndrome

Early life and education
David Weyhe Smith was born in Oakland, California. He gained his medical degree from Johns Hopkins School of Medicine and undertook postdoctoral studies during 1950-51 and 1953-56 in the Department of Pediatrics. He worked with Lawson Wilkins in the field of pediatric endocrinology.

Career
In 1958, he began working at the University of Wisconsin School of Medicine and Public Health , and became a professor of pediatrics there. From 1966 until the end of his career he was at the University of Washington, Seattle. His work in dysmorphology was recognized worldwide.

In 1973, Smith and Kenneth Lyons Jones identified a pattern of "craniofacial, limb, and cardiovascular defects associated with prenatal onset growth deficiency and developmental delay" in eight unrelated children of three ethnic groups, all born to mothers who were alcoholics.They called it Fetal alcohol syndrome .

Smith died of cancer in Seattle.

Works
His book Recognizable Patterns of Human Malformation is considered a key work in the field.  He also published five other monographs as well as nearly 200 papers.

Legacy
The condition known as Aase–Smith syndrome is named for Smith and colleague Jon Morton Aase. 
Smith also co-discovered  Smith–Lemli–Opitz syndrome, Marshall–Smith syndrome and Ruvalcaba-Myhre-Smith syndrome, Smith-Theiler-Schachenmann syndrome.

References

External links
American Journal of Pediatics Obituary
David Weyhe Smith, Who Named It?
Graham, John M.; Smith, David  W.. Smith's recognizable patterns of human deformation. PA, Elsevier, 2007 Google Books Jul. 2011

Johns Hopkins School of Medicine alumni
American pediatricians
Caetgory:Medical geneticists
University of Wisconsin–Madison faculty
University of Washington faculty
Road incident deaths in Washington (state)
Physicians from Seattle
People from Oakland, California
1926 births
1981 deaths
20th-century American physicians
Medical geneticists